Chef Nic is a Chinese food travelogue show starring Nicholas Tse and featuring different celebrity guests per episode. The first episode aired on July 12, 2014.

Episodes

Season 1

Season 2
Season 2 added regular cast members including William Chan, Yu Quan and Ma Su.
All 12 episodes are available for streaming on the main website.

Season 3

Chef Nic 2017

Chef Nic 2018

References

External links
Official website Season 1
Official website Season 2

Food travelogue television series
2014 Chinese television series debuts
Chinese cooking television series